Cindy Kirchhofer (born October 6, 1961) is an American politician who has served in the Indiana House of Representatives from the 89th district since 2010.

References

1961 births
Living people
Republican Party members of the Indiana House of Representatives
21st-century American politicians
21st-century American women politicians
People from Beech Grove, Indiana
Women state legislators in Indiana